Exoteleia burkei, the Monterey pine shoot moth, is a moth of the family Gelechiidae. It is found in North America, where it has been recorded from California.

The wingspan is 8–10 mm. The forewings are greyish brown with three white bands crossing the wing. These bands are edged with black.

The larvae feed on Pinus radiata, Pinus attenuata, Pinus coulteri and Pinus sabiniana. Young larvae mine the needles, while older larvae attack the developing shoots, but may also mine the buds and staminate cones. Full-grown larvae reach a length of 5–6 mm. They have a brownish-yellow body and black head.

References

Moths described in 1931
Exoteleia